The human voice consists of sound made by a human being using the vocal tract.

Voice may also refer to:

 Voice (grammar), of a verb
 Voice (music), or part, a single strand of music within a larger ensemble or composition
 Voice (phonetics), in phonetics and phonology

Arts, entertainment and media

Music

Groups
 Voice (duo), a Cypriot musical group
 Voice, a vocal quartet of Julie Tippetts, Maggie Nicols, Phil Minton, and Brian Eley

Albums and EPs
 Voice (Alison Moyet album), 2004
 Voice (Barratt Band album), 1983
 Voice (CNBLUE EP), 2009
 Voice (Emi Hinouchi album), 2011
 Voice (Hiromi album), 2011
 Voice (Hound Dog album), 1990
 Voice (Mika Nakashima album), 2008
 Voice (Neal Schon album), 2001
 Voice (Onew EP), 2018
 Voice (Taeyeon EP), 2019
 Voice (An Acoustic Collection), by Delerium, 2010
 Voice – The Best of Beverley Knight, 2006
Voice – The Best of Tour

Songs and composition
 "Voice (song)", a song by Ai, 2013
 "Voice" (Perfume song), 2010
 "Voice" (Porno Graffitti song), 2001
 "Voice", a song by Baek Ji-young, 2012
 "목소리" ('Voice'), a song by Loona from the 2020 EP 12:00
 "Voice", a song by VNV Nation from the 1998 album Praise the Fallen
 "Voices", a song from the 1994 anime series Macross Plus
 Voice (Takemitsu), a 1971 composition for solo flute by Toru Takemitsu

Film and television
 Voice (2005 film), a South Korean horror film
 Voice (2021 film), a South Korean crime film
 Voice (TV series), a 2017 South Korean TV series 
 Voice – Danmarks største stemme, a Danish reality singing competition

Other uses in arts and entertainment
 Character's voice, a character's manner of speech
 Voice acting
 Voice (manga), later Voiceful
 Writer's voice

Organisations
 Voice (Czech political party)
 Voice (Ukrainian political party)
 Victims of Immigration Crime Engagement, a U.S. government agency 
 Voice (trade union), a British trade union
 Voice (Indiana), an American anti-tobacco initiative

Other uses
 Vaginal and Oral Interventions to Control the Epidemic (VOICE), a clinical trial
 Voice, editions of Lerner Newspapers
 Voice, weekly newspaper published by Australian Labor Party (Tasmanian Branch) 1951–1953 (renamed from People's Voice, 1925–1931)
 Voices groups in Australia

See also

 The Voice (disambiguation)
 Voices (disambiguation)
 Voicing (disambiguation)
 Vocal music
 Singing
 Victims of Iranian Censorship Act, also known as VOICE Act